Anthony Hamilton ( – 1719), also known as Antoine and comte d'Hamilton, was a soldier and a writer of literature. As a Catholic of Irish and Scottish ancestry, he fled with his family to France during the Interregnum and later sided with James II against the Prince of Orange, which led him into another French exile.

As a soldier he fought in French service in the Franco-Dutch War (1672–1678) and then in the Irish Army in the Williamite War (1688–1690) where he fought on the losing side in the battles of Newtownbutler and the Boyne.

As a writer he chose French as his language and adopted a light and elegant style, seeking to amuse and entertain his reader. He is mainly known for the Mémoires du Comte de Grammont, which focuses on the time his brother-in-law Philibert, comte de Gramont, spent at the court of Charles II at Whitehall.

Birth and origins 
Anthony was born in 1644 or 1645 in Ireland, probably in Nenagh, County Tipperary. He was the third son of George Hamilton and his wife Mary Butler. His father was Scottish, the fourth son of James Hamilton, 1st Earl of Abercorn. Anthony's father was an officer in the Irish Army and would in 1660 be created baronet of Donalong and Nenagh.

Anthony's mother was Irish, the third daughter of Thomas Butler, Viscount Thurles, and a sister of James Butler, the future first duke of Ormond. Her family, the Butler dynasty, was Old English and descended from Theobald Walter, who had been appointed Chief Butler of Ireland by King Henry II in 1177. Anthony's parents had married in 1629. Ormond had granted Anthony's father in 1640 the manor, castle, town, and lands of Nenagh for 31 years. Anthony was one of nine siblings, who are listed in his father's article.

Both his parents were Catholic, but some relatives, on his father's as on his mother's side, were Protestants. His grandfather, James Hamilton, 1st Earl of Abercorn, had been a Protestant, but his father and all his paternal uncles were raised as Catholics due to the influence of his paternal grandmother, Marion Boyd, a recusant. His mother's family, the Butlers, were Catholics except the future 1st Duke of Ormond, his maternal uncle.

Irish childhood 
Hamilton was born during the Irish Confederate War, which had been partially halted by the Cessation, a truce concluded between the Confederates and King Charles I in September 1643. Hamilton's uncle Ormond had been appointed Lord Lieutenant of Ireland in November 1643 and employed Anthony's father at various administrative and military tasks.

However, in September 1646 Rinuccini, the papal nuncio, overthrew the Confederate Supreme Council in a coup d'état with help of Owen Roe O'Neill's Confederate Ulster Army. O'Neill led his army south to Kilkenny, the Confederate capital, where he arrived the 16th. Rinuccini then took power appointing a new Supreme Council the 26th. In the meantime, on the 17th, Ulster troops sacked Roscrea. The ulstermen had a reputation for living off the inhabitants, even friendly ones. Carte (1736) reports that "Sir G. Hamilton's lady, sister to the marquis of Ormond" was spared at Roscrea. However, it is more likely that infant Anthony, his mother, and elder siblings were safely at Nenagh and that the Lady Hamilton at Roscrea was his grandaunt, the wife of George Hamilton of Greenlaw and Roscrea, not his mother.

In 1649, during the Cromwellian conquest of Ireland, Hamilton's father was colonel of an infantry regiment and governor of Nenagh. He defended Nenagh Castle in November 1650 when it was attacked and captured by Ireton's Parliamentarian army on the way back from their unsuccessful siege of Limerick to their winter quarters at Kilkenny.

First French exile 
In spring 1651, when Anthony was about seven, his father, accompanied by his wife and children, followed his brother-in-law, Ormond, from Ireland into French exile. They first went to Caen, Normandy, where they were accommodated for some time by Anthony's aunt Elizabeth Preston, the Marchioness of Ormond. His father and his elder brothers, James and George, were soon employed by Charles II in various functions. His mother then moved to Paris where she found shelter in the convent of the Feuillantines, together with her sister Eleanor Butler, Lady Muskerry. Anthony's sister Elizabeth was sent to the boarding school of the convent of Port-Royal-des-Champs, near Versailles together with Lady Muskerry's daughter Helen. It may be that Anthony was left behind in Caen to be taught together with his Ormond cousins Thomas Butler, 6th Earl of Ossory and Richard Butler, 1st Earl of Arran.

Restoration court 
Hamilton and his family returned to London in 1660 with the advent of the English Restoration. His father was created Baronet of Donalong and Nenagh in 1660 by Charles II, but Charles refused to go further than that because the family was Catholic.

Anthony, his eldest brother James, his sister Elizabeth, and his younger brother George became courtiers in the inner circle at Whitehall. The King arranged a Protestant marriage for James in 1691.

In January 1663 Anthony met at Whitehall Philibert, chevalier de Gramont, a French exile. Gramont was already in his forties and a younger half-brother of the duc de Gramont, Marshal of France. He had got into trouble by courting Mademoiselle Anne-Lucie de la Mothe-Houdancourt, on whom Louis XIV had set his eyes.

Hamilton befriended Gramont, who quickly became part of the court's inner circle. Gramont courted Anthony's sister Elizabeth, "La belle Hamilton", who was seduced by Gramont's verbiage and gallantry. He married her in London either in December 1663 or early in 1664. In March 1664, Louis XIV, having heard of Gramont's marriage, allowed him to return. On 7 September, the couple had a son who died as an infant.

Second French exile 
In 1667, Anthony's brother George refused to take the oath of supremacy and went to France. George recruited a regiment in Ireland for French service and fought in the Franco-Dutch War (1672–1678). Anthony followed George to France in 1667 and took service in that regiment. Some time later they were joined by Anthony's younger brother Richard.

Anthony probably fought together with George under Turenne in the Battle of Sinsheim in June 1674, and did quite surely so at Entzheim in October against Imperial troops as he and George were reported wounded at that battle. George's and Anthony's wounds as well as the voyage to England, described below, caused them to miss Turenne's winter campaign 1674/1675, during which the French marched south and surprised the Imperialists in upper Alsace, beating them at Turckheim on 5 January 1675. George returned to France from England, but Anthony and Richard continued to Ireland to recruit for the regiment. The recruits were picked up by French ships at Kinsale in April after a missed appointment at Dingle in March.

On 27 July 1675 Anthony probably fought together with George at Sasbach, where Turenne was killed. Two of Turenne's general officers considered themselves second in command: Count Guy Aldonce de Durfort de Lorges and the marquis de Vaubrun. At the retreat from Sasbach and the Battle of Altenheim in August the French army was therefore commanded by both until Vaubrun was killed in that battle on 1 August 1676. Finally arrived the new commander, Condé, whom the King had appointed. However, Condé was old and was soon replaced by Luxembourg. George was killed in June 1676 while commanding Luxembourg's rear-guard at the Zaberner Steige where imperial troops under Charles V, Duke of Lorraine pursued the French who were retreating eastward to Saverne in lower Alsace. Anthony succeeded to his brother's somewhat doubtful French title of comte d'Hamilton. Voltaire calls him "comte" in his note of 1739. The Peace of Nijmegen of 1678 ended the Franco-Dutch War and Anthony seems to have returned to Ireland.

According to the majority view, the comte d'Hamilton, as he was now called, visited France in 1681 and played one of six zephyrs needed in the performance of Quinault's ballet the Triomphe de l'Amour, to music by Lully, on 21 January 1681 N.S. at the Château de Saint-Germain-en-Laye before the king. However, some believe it was Richard.

Ireland 
In 1685 James II acceded to the English throne. He created Richard Talbot 1st Earl of Tyrconnell and entrusted him with the command of the Irish army. Tyrconnell, a Catholic, recruited Anthony as well as his younger brothers Richard and John. Anthony was appointed lieutenant-colonel of Sir Thomas Newcomen's infantry regiment. Later that year he was appointed governor of Limerick where Newcomen's regiment was garrisoned, replacing Sir William King, a Protestant. Shortly he demonstrated his Catholicism when he went publicly to mass.

In 1688, at the eve of the Glorious Revolution, Hamilton was sent with his battalion to England in an effort to provide James with reliable Catholic troops. After James's flight Hamilton's regiment surrendered in Portsmouth on 20 December 1688.
Hamilton made his way back to Ireland where he was promoted major-general and given the command of the dragoons, under Justin McCarthy, Viscount Mountcashel, in actions around Enniskillen. At some stage his unit was garrisoned in Belturbet, County Cavan. In the battle of Newtownbutler on 31 July 1689, serving under Mountcashel, he was wounded in the leg at the beginning of the action, and his dragoons were routed. He succeeded in making good his escape. Hamilton was considered to have led his dragoons into an ambush by over-confidence; and to have made minimal efforts to extricate them. With Captain Lavallin from Cork he served as scapegoat for the defeat, being subjected to a court martial under General de Rosen. Given his family's influence, Hamilton was acquitted, while the hapless Lavallin was shot. However, the reputations of the Hamilton brothers had suffered terminal damage with the French.

Hamilton fought in the cavalry at the battle of the Boyne on 1 July 1690. He also took part in the Siege of Limerick (1690) and when William had to raise the siege in autumn, Tyrconnell sent him to France to report the victory. He does not seem to have returned to Ireland and was absent at the Battle of Aughrim on 12 July 1691 where his youngest brother, John, was mortally wounded.

Final French exile, death, and timeline 
Hamilton spent the last thirty years of his life mainly at the court of Saint-Germain-en-Laye, with visits to the châteaux of his friends and to Les Moulineaux, his sister Elizabeth's house at Versailles. From his years in Ireland he was a friend of the Duke of Berwick. He became an especial favourite with Ludovise, duchesse du Maine, and it was at her seat at Sceaux that he wrote the Mémoires that made him famous. In 1701 he accompanied Berwick on a mission to Rome to obtain the support of the new pope, Clement XI, for the Jacobite cause. In May 1703 his sister Elizabeth was given a house called Les Moulineaux, where he visited her often and which became a centre of his social world. In 1707 his friend Gramont died. On 3 June 1708 his sister Elizabeth, the comtesse de Gramont died in Paris. He never married and died at the Château de Saint-Germain-en-Laye on 20 April 1719.

Works 
Antoine Hamilton is mainly known for a single book: the Mémoires du Comte de Grammont. After this followed some shorter works among which the four short stories: Le Bélier, Fleur d'Epine, Zénéyde, and Les quatre Facardins.

Memoirs 
Anthony Hamilton wrote the Mémoires du Comte de Gramont between 1704 and 1710 at the age of 59 to 65. This work made Hamilton one of the classical writers of France. The tone of the work, however, is now thought equivocal. By highlighting the brilliance of the London Restoration court, the book threw into relief the lacklustre nature of the exiled Stuart court. It has even been said to share something with the anti-jacobite polemic written against the court of James II at St Germain by John Macky.

The book starts with the sentence (as translated by Horace Walpole):
As those who read only for amusement are, in my opinion, more worthy of attention than those who open a book merely to find a fault, to the former I address myself, and for their entertainment commit the following pages to press, without being in the least concerned about the severe criticism of the latter.
The work was said to have been written at Gramont's dictation, but Hamilton's share is obvious and the book situates itself at the cross-roads between memoirs, biography, and fiction.

The work was first published anonymously in 1713, apparently without Hamilton's knowledge. The first English translation is the one by Abel Boyer, which appeared in 1714. Walpole's translation is the classical one and used in many editions. It seem it has been published for the first time in 1773 at Strawberry Hill Press. Peter Quennell retranslated the Memoirs in 1930. It was published accompanied with extensive commentary by Cyril Hughes Hartmann.

Other works 
In imitation and satiric parody of the romantic tales that Antoine Galland's translation of Thousand and One Nights had brought into fashion, Hamilton wrote, partly for the amusement of Henrietta Bulkley, sister of Anne, Duchess of Berwick, to whom he was much attached, four ironic and extravagant contes (fairy tales): Le Bélier, Fleur d'Epine, Zénéyde and Les quatre Facardins. The saying in Le Belier, "Belier, mon ami, tu me ferais plaisir si tu voulais commencer par le commencement," passed into a proverb. These tales were circulated privately during Hamilton's lifetime. The first three were published in Paris in 1730, ten years after the author's death; a collection of his Œuvres diverses in 1731 contained the unfinished Zénéyde. An 1849 omnibus entitled Fairy Tales and Romances contained English translations of all his fiction.

Hamilton also wrote some songs, and exchanged amusing verses with the Duke of Berwick. In the name of his niece, the countess of Stafford, Hamilton maintained a witty correspondence with Lady Mary Wortley Montagu.

Notes and references

Notes

Citations

Sources 

 
 
 
  – (for his sisters)
 
 
  – 1643 to 1660
  – (Preview)

 
 
  – 1649 to 1664
  – Ab-Adam to Basing (for Abercorn family tree)
 
 
  – 1707 to 1709
  – England
 
  – (for timeline)
  – Does not seem to be available online
  – Princeps
 
 
 
 
  – (1st page abstract only)
  – Viscounts
 
 
 
 
  
 
  – Abercorn to Balmerino
  
  – 1706 to 1707
 
 
 
  – 1643 to 1660 and index
 
  – (for timeline)

1645 births
1719 deaths
French people of Scottish descent
French Army officers
Irish exiles
Irish Jacobites
Irish writers in French
Jacobite military personnel of the Williamite War in Ireland
People from Drogheda
People from County Tipperary
Military personnel from Caen
Younger sons of baronets